The Santa Ana River in the U.S. state of California has over 20 significant tributaries and there are over 50 significant streams in the watershed.

List
Greenville-Banning Channel
Huntington Beach Channel
Santiago Creek
Handy Creek
Black Star Canyon
Limestone Canyon
Silverado Creek
Ladd Canyon
Modjeska Creek
Harding Creek
Blue Mud Creek
Brush Creek
Aliso Creek
Bane Canyon Creek
Water Canyon Creek
Fresno Canyon
Wardlow Wash
Chino Creek
Mill Creek
Cucamonga Creek
Deer Creek
Calamity Creek
Day Canyon Wash
Etiwanda Creek
San Antonio Creek
Stoddard Creek
Kerkhoff Creek
Bear Creek
Icehouse Creek
Cedar Creek
Temescal Creek
Arlington Valley Channel
Oak Avenue Drain                                                     
Mabey Canyon Creek
Oak Street Creek Reservoir
Hagador Canyon  	
Tin Mine Canyon 
Main Street Wash 
Main Street Canyon   
Eagle Canyon Creek 
Joseph Canyon
Bedford Canyon Wash
Cajalco Canyon Creek
Lake Mathews 
Upper Cajalco Canyon Creek
Harford Spring Canyon
Mead Creek
Olsen Canyon Wash
Brown Canyon
McBribe Canyon Creek
Coldwater Canyon Creek
Dawson Canyon Creek
Mayhew Canyon Creek
Indian Canyon Creek
Lee Lake
Cow Canyon Creek
Horsetheif Canyon Creek  
Ceramic Factory Canyon Creek  
Rice Canyon Creek
Bishop Canyon Creek
Alberhill Canyon Creek, in Walker Canyon
Gavilan Wash, in Walker Canyon
Stovepipe Wash
Arroyo Del Toro
Wasson Canyon Wash 
Lake Elsinore
McVicker Canyon Creek
Leach Canyon Creek
Lakeland Village Channel
San Jacinto River
Cottonwood Canyon Creek in Railroad Canyon
Canyon Lake in Railroad Canyon
Salt Creek
Perris Valley Channel
Bautista Creek
Indian Creek
North Fork San Jacinto River
Logan Creek
Stone Creek
Black Mountain Creek
Fuller Mill Creek
South Fork San Jacinto River
Dry Creek
Strawberry Creek
Coldwater Creek
Spillway Canyon Creek
Lake Hemet
Herkey Creek
Fobes Canyon Creek
Pipe Creek
Martinez Creek
Gold Shot Creek
Penrod Canyon Creek
Hole Lake Creek
Hole Lake
Arroyo Tequesquito
Sycamore Canyon
Box Springs Canyon
Sunnyslope Channel
Sunnyslope Creek
Lake Evans Outflow
Lake Evans
Spring Brook 
Rialto Waste Water Treatment Outflow
Lytle Creek
Warm Creek
East Twin Creek
Strawberry Creek
Sand Creek
Cajon Wash
Cable Creek
Lone Pine Creek
Crowder Creek
Grapevine Creek
Meyer Creek
South Fork Lytle Creek
Bonita Creek
Middle Fork Lytle Creek
North Fork Lytle Creek
Sheep Creek
Coldwater Canyon Creek
San Timoteo Creek
Yucaipa Creek
Little San Gorgonio Creek
Noble Creek 
City Creek
Bledsoe Gulch
Schenk Creek
East Fork City Creek
West Fork City Creek
Elder Gulch
Plunge Creek
Oak Creek
Fredalba Creek
Little Mill Creek
Mill Creek
Spoor Creek
Mountain Home Creek
Skinner Creek
East Fork Mountain Home Creek
Glen Martin Creek
Frustration Creek
Monkeyface Creek
Oak Cove Creek
Bridal Veil Creek
Hatchery Creek
Momyer Creek
Slide Creek
Alger Creek
Falls Creek
Vivian Creek
High Creek
Morton Creek
Deep Creek
Government Creek
Warm Springs Creek
Alder Creek
Keller Creek
Monroe Creek
Crystal Creek
Breakneck Creek
Bear Creek
North Fork Bear Creek
Siberia Creek
North Creek
Grout Creek
Minnelusa Creek
Rathbun Creek
Sawmill Creek
Deer Creek
Mile Creek
Cienaga Creek
Barton Creek
Hamilton Creek
Converse Creek
Staircase Creek
South Fork Santa Ana River
Lost Creek
Wildhorse Creek
Cienaga Seca Creek
Heart Bar Creek
Coon Creek

References

 
Tributaries
Santa Ana River
Santa Ana River
Santa Ana River
Santa Ana River
S
Santa Ana River
Santa Ana